Group 11 is a rugby league competition in the surrounding areas of Dubbo, New South Wales, Australia. The competition is played in four grades, these being First-Grade, Reserve-Grade, Under 19s and Ladies League Tag.

Current clubs
First grade and under 18s sides of Group 11 Clubs play in the Peter McDonald Premiership alongside Group 10 clubs. From the 2022 season, Group 11 will only officially field reserve and women's league tag competitions, although a Group 11 Premier will still be crowned in First Grade and Under 18s, with this being the best team in the Group 11 Pool of the Peter McDonald Premiership.

Previous clubs

Return of Westside 
At a Group 11 AGM on Sunday 17 November 2013 the Group approved an application by the Dubbo Westside RLFC to be re-admitted to the competition as a result of a ballot undertaken by stakeholders that returned a resounding 25–11 vote in favour of Westside thus returning the club to the competition after the club folded in 1999. The Rabbitohs won the Group 11 Premiership twice with back to back title wins in 1981 and 1982 and It is expected the Rabbitohs will play their home games at No.1 Oval after the ground's previous rugby league tenants Dubbo CYMS elected to make the move to Apex Oval. The club folded as of 2020.

Group 11 Premiers

Group 11 Premiers By Grade 1946-2019

First Grade Honour Board 1946-Present 

 1946: Wellington
 1947: Canowindra
 1948: Wellington
 1949: Dubbo
 1950: Condobolin
 1951: Peak Hill
 1952: Narromine
 1953: Narromine
 1954: Parkes
 1955: Narromine
 1956: Narromine
 1957: Condobolin
 1958: Forbes
 1959: Dubbo Macquarie
 1960: Dubbo Macquarie
 1961: Dubbo Macquarie
 1962: Forbes
 1963: Eugowra
 1964: Eugowra
 1965: Eugowra
 1966: Eugowra
 1967: Eugowra
 1968: Narromine
 1969: Dubbo CYMS
 1970: Forbes
 1971: Dubbo CYMS
 1972: Parkes
 1973: Parkes
 1974: Narromine
 1975: Dubbo CYMS
 1976: Narromine
 1977: Forbes
 1978: Dubbo Macquarie
 1979: Dubbo Macquarie
 1980: Narromine
 1981: Dubbo Westside
 1982: Dubbo Westside
 1983: Parkes
 1984: Parkes
 1985: Dubbo Macquarie
 1986: Dubbo CYMS
 1987: Forbes
 1988: Parkes
 1989: Gilgandra
 1990: Wellington
 1991: Wellington
 1992: Wellington
 1993: Cobar 
 1994: Wellington 
 1995: Narromine 
 1996: Parkes 
 1997: Cobar 
 1998: Cobar 
 1999: Manildra 
 2000: Dubbo Macquarie
 2001: Dubbo CYMS
 2002: Dubbo CYMS
 2003: Dubbo CYMS
 2004: Dubbo CYMS
 2005: Narromine 
 2006: Cobar 
 2007: Dubbo CYMS
 2008: Dubbo Macquarie
 2009: Dubbo CYMS
 2010: Parkes 
 2011: Dubbo CYMS
 2012: Dubbo Macquarie
 2013: Parkes 
 2014: Dubbo CYMS
 2015: Dubbo CYMS
 2016: Forbes 
 2017: Dubbo CYMS
 2018: Forbes
 2019: Wellington 
 2022: Forbes

Source:

Peter McDonald Premiership Group 11 Conference Premiers (2022-present)

Group 11 Reserve Grade Premiers (2022-Present)

Group 11 League Tag Premiers (2022-Present)

Under 18s Western Premiership Premiers (2022-Present) 

Complete joint competition and competition table with Group 10 (no distinct Group Premiers).

Junior Competition

Group 11 JRL
The following clubs participate in the Group 11 Junior League. Where applicable, the club's differing Senior side/competition is listed.

Lachlan District JRL
 Cabonne United Roos (Molong and Manildra, Woodbridge Cup)
 Canowindra Tigers (Woodbridge Cup)
 Condobolin Rams JRL (Woodbridge Cup)
 Forbes Magpies
 Grenfell Goannas (Woodbridge Cup)
 Parkes Marist (Spacemen)
 Red Bend College Blues (No seniors)
 West Wyalong JRL (Group 20)

Dubbo District JRL
 Cobar Roosters JRL (Castlereagh Cup)
 Narromine Jets Juniors (Castlereagh Cup)
 Nyngan Tigers JRL
 South Dubbo Raiders (Dubbo Macquarie)
 St Johns Dubbo (No Seniors)
 Warren Bulldogs (No Seniors)
 Wellington Cowboys JRL

Notable Juniors 
Dubbo CYMS
 Matt Burton (2019-21 Penrith Panthers) (2022- Canterbury-Bankstown Bulldogs)
 Isaah Yeo (2014- Penrith Panthers)
St Johns Dubbo
 Kaide Ellis (2018-19 Penrith Panthers) (2020- St George-Illawarra Dragons)
Forbes Magpies
 Charlie Staines (2020- Penrith Panthers)
Parkes Spacemen
 Billy Burns (2019-21 Penrith Panthers) (2021- St George-Illawarra Dragons)
 Darby Medlyn (2020- Canberra Raiders)
Wellington Cowboys
 Kotoni Staggs (2018- Brisbane Broncos)
 Brent Naden (2019- Penrith Panthers) (2022- Canterbury-Bankstown Bulldogs)
 Tyrone Peachey (2013 Cronulla-Sutherland Sharks) (2014-18 Penrith Panthers) (2019- Gold Coast Titans)
 Blake Ferguson (2009-10 Cronulla-Sutherland Sharks) (2011-13 Canberra Raiders) (2015-18 Sydney Roosters) (2019- Parramatta Eels)

See also

Woodbridge Cup
Peter McDonald Premiership
Rugby League Competitions in Australia

References

External links
 Group 11 Homepage

Rugby league competitions in New South Wales